Potassium voltage-gated channel subfamily A member 4 also known as Kv1.4 is a protein that in humans is encoded by the KCNA4 gene. It contributes to the cardiac transient outward potassium current (Ito1), the main contributing current to the repolarizing phase 1 of the cardiac action potential.

Description
Potassium channels represent the most complex class of voltage-gated ion channels from both functional and structural standpoints. Their diverse functions include regulating neurotransmitter release, heart rate, insulin secretion, neuronal excitability, epithelial electrolyte transport, smooth muscle contraction, and cell volume. Four sequence-related potassium channel genes - shaker, shaw, shab, and shal - have been identified in Drosophila, and each has been shown to have human homolog(s). This gene encodes a member of the potassium channel, voltage-gated, shaker-related subfamily. This member contains six membrane-spanning domains with a shaker-type repeat in the fourth segment. It belongs to the A-type potassium current class, the members of which may be important in the regulation of the fast repolarizing phase of action potentials in heart and thus may influence the duration of cardiac action potential. The coding region of this gene is intronless, and the gene is clustered with genes KCNA3 and KCNA10 on chromosome 1 in humans.

KCNA4 (Kv1.4) contains a tandem inactivation domain at the N terminus. It is composed of two subdomains. Inactivation domain 1 (ID1, residues 1-38) consists of a flexible N terminus anchored at a 5-turn helix, and is thought to work by occluding the ion pathway, as is the case with a classical ball domain. Inactivation domain 2 (ID2, residues 40-50) is a 2.5 turn helix with a high proportion of hydrophobic residues that probably serves to attach ID1 to the cytoplasmic face of the channel. In this way, it can promote rapid access of ID1 to the receptor site in the open channel. ID1 and ID2 function together to bring about fast inactivation of the Kv1.4 channel, which is important for the role of the channel in short-term plasticity.

Interactions 

KCNA4 has been shown to interact with DLG4, KCNA2 and DLG1.

See also 
 Voltage-gated potassium channel
 Voltage-gated potassium-channel Kv1.4 IRES

References

Further reading

External links 
 
 
 

Protein families
Ion channels